Riverview Historic District is a historic district along the Chattahoochee River in River View, Alabama. It was listed on the Alabama Register of Landmarks and Heritage on December 19, 1991, and on the National Register of Historic Places on November 12, 1999.

See also
Langdale Historic District

Gallery

References

External links
Historic American Engineering Record (HAER) documentation, filed under Valley, Chambers County, AL:

Historic American Engineering Record in Alabama
Historic districts in Chambers County, Alabama
Historic districts on the National Register of Historic Places in Alabama
National Register of Historic Places in Chambers County, Alabama
Properties on the Alabama Register of Landmarks and Heritage